Jelutong is a suburb of George Town in Penang, Malaysia. Located south of the Pinang River, Jelutong has been inhabited since as early as the late 18th century, when traders from Aceh and India settled around the area.

It was once notorious as a turf for gangsters and triads until the 1980s, when urbanisation transformed the area into a residential suburb of George Town.

Etymology 

Jelutong was named after the Jelutong tree, known scientifically as Dyera costulata. It was believed that this species of trees was once abundant around the area now known as Jelutong.

History 
Jelutong was already inhabited before the arrival of Captain Francis Light in 1786. Merchants from Aceh and India established resting places and villages along the mouth of Pinang River.

In the mid-19th century, the then forested area was first cleared for agricultural purposes. Factories were set up much later in Jelutong, as the urban population spilled southward from George Town proper. In spite of industrialisation, some fishing communities continued to exist up until recently and charcoal makers still make a living from the mangrove swamps along the coast.

The growing population in Jelutong led to rampant crime and thugs roaming the streets. It was only in the 1980s with a rise in the standards of living and urbanisation that Jelutong's criminal notoriety was eradicated.

It was in the Jelutong parliamentary constituency where Karpal Singh, a prominent Malaysian lawyer, first entered the national political scene. The Democratic Action Party politician held the seat for over 20 years until 1999, earning him the nickname the 'Tiger of Jelutong'.

Transportation 
Jelutong's proximity to George Town, immediately north of the Pinang River that separates both locations, makes the suburb easily accessible from the city centre by road. Five bridges now traverse the Pinang River, linking the Jelutong suburb with the city centre.

Historically, Jelutong Road serves as the main thoroughfare within the suburb, allowing motorists from the city centre to head south towards Bayan Lepas. In recent years, the completion of the Tun Dr Lim Chong Eu Expressway has considerably reduced the daily traffic congestion along Jelutong Road, as motorists now use the coastal expressway to commute between George Town and Bayan Lepas, bypassing Jelutong Road entirely.

Rapid Penang buses 11, 12, 301, 302, 303 and 401 serve the residents of the suburb, by connecting Jelutong with George Town to the north and other destinations within the southern side of Penang Island, including Bukit Jambul, Bayan Baru, Bayan Lepas, Batu Maung and Balik Pulau.

In addition, a cycling lane has been installed within Jelutong as part of the move to encourage cycling as a form of alternative transportation. The cycling lane along the Tun Dr Lim Chong Eu Expressway includes a  route between Komtar in George Town proper and Karpal Singh Drive, and a three-lane concrete and steel bridge across the Pinang River. A LinkBike station was placed at Karpal Singh Drive as well in 2017, enabling cyclists to rent bicycles to commute to the rest of George Town.

Education 

A total of six primary schools and one high school are located within Jelutong. The primary schools include three Chinese-medium schools and one Tamil-medium school.

The Penang Japanese School is located at Jalan Sungai Pinang, at the southern banks of the Pinang River. Another international school, the Wesley Methodist International School at Karpal Singh Drive, is slated for completion in 2018.

Primary schools
 SJK (C) Beng Teik
 SJK (C) Jelutong
 SJK (C) Moh Ghee Cawangan
 SJK (C) Phei Shin
 SJK (T) Jalan Sungai
 SK Jelutong
 SK Jelutong Barat

High school
 SMK Jelutong
International schools
 Penang Japanese School
 Wesley Methodist International School (under construction)

Sports 
The Nicol David International Squash Centre, located at Dumbar Hill, was previously known as the Bukit Dumbar Sports Centre. It was here where Nicol David, a top international squash player, was first trained at a young age.

Shopping 
 Automall, Karpal Singh Drive

Infrastructure 
Karpal Singh Drive, along the coast of Jelutong, was originally named the IJM Promenade, as the reclaimed residential neighbourhood had been constructed by IJM Land Berhad Group. It was renamed posthumously in honour of Karpal Singh, a prominent Penang politician who was once the Member of Parliament for Jelutong, following his death in 2014. This promenade has been gaining popularity for recreational and retail activities, as well as the annual New Year celebrations.

Neighbourhoods 
 Karpal Singh Drive
 Sungai Pinang

References

Populated places in Penang
George Town, Penang